Haftuman (also Romanized as Haftūmān and Haftowman; also known as Haft Tūmān) is a village in Nakhlestan Rural District, in the Central District of Khur and Biabanak County, Isfahan Province, Iran. At the 2006 census, its population was 114, in 41 families.

References 

Populated places in Khur and Biabanak County